Largo Medical Center is a 455-bed teaching hospital located in Largo, in the US state of Florida. The hospital has three campuses in Largo and in Clearwater, employs approximately 1,800 people, and is owned by Hospital Corporation of America, a Nashville, Tennessee-based company.  As a teaching facility, Largo Medical Center operates a number of residency programs. The hospital is accredited by the Joint Commission.

History
From orthopedics to spine, and wound care to services healing an ailing heart the hospital Largo Medical Center has grown to provide some of the most comprehensive healthcare services in the area. Largo Medical Center opened in 1978 with Jack Bovender as the hospital's Chief Executive Officer. He later went on to become CEO of Hospital Corporation of America now known as HCA Healthcare, the parent company of Largo Medical Center. Today the hospital's CEO is Adam Rudd.

The hospital was the first in Pinellas County to acquire a surgical robot in the year 2000. In 2008, the hospital's second campus on Indian Rocks Road was purchased, adding behavioral health and inpatient rehabilitation to the services provided. The Florida Breast Institute opened the same year. In 2013, surgeons starting performing bariatric surgery and it was in 2015 that kidney transplants began to be followed by liver transplants and now the hospital performs heart transplantation.

References

External links
Largo Medical Center homepage
 

Hospital buildings completed in 1978
Buildings and structures in Largo, Florida
Hospitals in Florida
Teaching hospitals in Florida
1978 establishments in Florida